Alexamenus, a general of the Aetolians in 196 BC, who was sent by the Aetolians in 192 during the War against Nabis, to obtain possession of Lacedaemon.  He succeeded in his object, and killed Nabis, the tyrant of Lacedaemon; but the Lacedaemonians rising against him shortly after, he and most of his troops were killed.

Notes 

2nd-century BC Greek people
Ancient Greek generals
Ancient Aetolians